Fayette Area Coordinated Transportation, known by the moniker of FACT, is a public transportation service located in Fayette County, Pennsylvania. It provides inter-city bus and paratransit service to select communities within the county. Because the region is located within the metropolitan (but not the urban) area of Pittsburgh, four times per day service is provided to the Downtown Pittsburgh area.  In 2009, the Connellsville-Uniontown Route was extended into Westmoreland County to the Countryside Plaza Shopping Center, near Mount Pleasant.

Hubs and Stations 
There are two Hubs in the county, each with a park and ride lot, and a Bus Station to handle "after-hours" traffic that comes with a bench and minimal shelter from the elements.

Transit Center 
The FACT Transit Center, located at the Connellsville Airport Complex in Dunbar Township, was completed in 2005. There is a Waiting Area, Comfort Station, Vending Machines, and the Admiministrative Offices, as well as the Bus Garages. There is a 40-vehicle park and ride located here, where the Pittsburgh Commuter and Connellsvlle-Uniontown Routes are accessible to the rider in a safe and secure environment.

Transfer Center 
In 2010, the Transfer Center opened in the Fayette County Business Park in South Union Township. The  facility is open Monday - Friday and all Public Buses stop at the center at regular intervals. The center is also equipped with Vending Machines, Comfort Station, Waiting Area, and a Ticket/Token Office. One can also receive real-time bus information. There is also a Park-and-Ride lot there with a capacity of 40 vehicles in a safe and secure environment.

Uniontown Hub 
The Uniontown Hub is located at Church and Beeson Streets in Uniontown. There is only a bench and minimal shelter here. Public-Transit Buses stop here when the Transfer Center is closed on nights and weekends.

Route list 
FACT provides evening and weekend service, and commuter trips on weekdays to downtown Pittsburgh. Shown on this schedule are all municipalities that feature FACT stops, with the served villages within these jurisdictions in parentheses.

References 

Bus transportation in Pennsylvania
Paratransit services in the United States
Transportation in Fayette County, Pennsylvania